Karagül (English title: Black Rose) is a Turkish romantic drama series that broadcast on Fox Turkey between March 29, 2013 and June 10, 2016.

Plot 
Ebru and Murat have three children. One day the wife, Ebru, receives the news that her husband has disappeared by falling into a river in Halfeti, his hometown. From that moment, her life changes radically. She finds out that her husband has lost all family assets and mortgaged his assets. Ebru moves to Halfeti to find her husband's body. There she is alone and without money, she also discovers that her husband had a first wife. In that place, she will have to deal with Kendal, the family first-born  who was always jealous of Murat because he wanted to be the sole heir of the family; however, Kendal does not have a child who can continue with his legacy since the only one he has is disabled. Ebru will also meet Baran, her first child with Murat who was supposedly born dead.

Cast

Series overview

International broadcasts 
Africa
  - Capital Broadcasting Channel
  - Nessma TV

Asia
  - Tolo TV

  - Farsi1 TV
  - KurdMax
  - Urdu 1
  - antv
  - TV9 
  - MBC
  - Lebanese Broadcasting Corporation
  - CCTV
  - TV3

Europe
  - TV Klan
  - Hayat TV
  - Nova
  - Nova TV
  - Star Channel
  - Sitel TV
  - TV Vijesti
  - Pro TV, Acasă TV
  - RTV Pink, Pink Soap
  - 1+1
  - Imedi TV

Latin America
  - Canal 13
  - Repretel
  - Latina Televisión
  - Canal 10
 Pasiones Latin America

References

External links 
 
 

2013 Turkish television series debuts
Fox (Turkish TV channel) original programming
Turkish drama television series
Television series produced in Istanbul
Television shows set in Istanbul
Television series set in the 2010s